Louise Anneli Schillgard (born 23 October 1989) is a Swedish professional footballer who plays as a  midfielder. She last played for Boston Breakers of the American National Women's Soccer League (NWSL) in 2016. She did not play in 2015 but spent part of 2014 with Älta IF of the Elitettan, on loan from Liverpool of the English FA WSL. At club level she also played for Linköping FC in Sweden's Damallsvenskan, Hammarby IF, AIK, Western Sydney Wanderers FC in Australia's W-League, and RCD Espanyol in Spain's Superliga Femenina. Schillgard won 23 caps for the Sweden women's national football team and represented her country at UEFA Women's Euro 2009 in Finland.

Club career
Nicknamed "Lollo", she signed a two-year extension to her Linköpings contract in October 2011.

On 12 December 2012 it was announced that Schillgard had signed a contract with Liverpool. On 29 September 2013, in the end-of-season decider 2–0 win against Bristol, Schillgard scored Liverpool's first goal from the penalty spot and helped Liverpool clinch their first FA WSL title. Schillgard departed Liverpool on loan in January 2014, to play for Älta IF of the Elitettan. The decision was related to the planning of her wedding. She intended to return to the Reds for their UEFA Women's Champions League campaign in 2014–15.

On 30 June 2014, twenty-four-year-old Schillgard announced her sudden retirement from all football. Having played at the top level since the age of 14, she wanted to prioritise her family life, but did not rule out a return to professional soccer in future.

In January 2016 she was tempted out of retirement by her former Liverpool coach Matt Beard, who signed her for his new club, Boston Breakers of the National Women's Soccer League (NWSL).

On 10 November 2016, after one season at Boston Breakers, the club announced Schillgard was not returning for the 2017 season due to personal reasons.

International career
Schillgard was a member of the Swedish national team from her debut against Romania in September 2008, and played at the 2009 European Championship. She subsequently took part in the 2011 World Cup qualifying campaign, but was not selected for the final tournament.

She was also overlooked for the 2012 Olympic football tournament in London and UEFA Women's Euro 2013, which Sweden hosted. Disappointed Schillgard suspected that she was excluded on grounds of her character rather than her ability.

Honours

Club
 Liverpool
 FA WSL (1): 2013

See also
 Foreign players in the FA WSL
 List of foreign W-League (Australia) players
 List of foreign NWSL players
 List of Western Sydney Wanderers Women players

References

External links

 
 Swedish National Team profile 
 
 

1989 births
Living people
Swedish women's footballers
Sweden women's international footballers
Hammarby Fotboll (women) players
AIK Fotboll (women) players
RCD Espanyol Femenino players
Linköpings FC players
Western Sydney Wanderers FC (A-League Women) players
Liverpool F.C. Women players
Boston Breakers players
Damallsvenskan players
Primera División (women) players
A-League Women players
Women's Super League players
National Women's Soccer League players
Expatriate women's footballers in Spain
Expatriate women's soccer players in Australia
Expatriate women's footballers in England
Expatriate women's soccer players in the United States
Swedish expatriate women's footballers
Swedish expatriate sportspeople in the United Kingdom
Swedish expatriate sportspeople in the United States
Swedish expatriate sportspeople in Spain
Swedish expatriate sportspeople in Australia
Women's association football midfielders
Footballers from Stockholm